
Gmina Nowosolna is a rural gmina (administrative district) in Łódź East County, Łódź Voivodeship, in central Poland. It has its seat in the former village of Nowosolna, although this is now part of the Widzew district of Łódź, and is therefore not part of the territory of the gmina.

The gmina contains part of the protected area called Łódź Hills Landscape Park.

Villages
Gmina Nowosolna contains the villages and settlements of Boginia, Borchówka, Borki, Byszewy, Dąbrowa, Dąbrówka, Głogowiec, Grabina, Janów, Kalonka, Kopanka, Ksawerów, Lipiny, Moskwa, Natolin, Niecki, Nowe Skoszewy, Plichtów, Stare Skoszewy, Teolin, Wiączyń Dolny and Wódka.

Neighbouring gminas
Gmina Nowosolna is bordered by the city of Łódź and by the gminas of Andrespol, Brzeziny and Stryków.

References
Polish official population figures 2006

Nowosolna
Łódź East County